Chaz Ortiz (born May 4, 1994) is an American professional skateboarder. As of 2017, he is ranked the 23rd skateboarder globally and the 13th in street skating. In 2012, he gained recognition as the youngest person to place first in the Dew Tour Championship.

Life and career
Growing up in the suburbs of Chicago, Ortiz had a knack for skateboards when he received his first one from his cousin at age six. Although acquired his interest at a young age, his real competitive upbringing was in the footsteps of his dad; Mark Ortiz, through wrestling.
 
Ortiz became the state wrestling champion at age 11 but went back to skateboarding in time to prepare for the Gatorade Free Flow Tour, where he finished in first place at age 13. The same year, he took the second-place spot in the Volcom Damn Am contest, behind Scott DeCenzo.

Ortiz obtained his professional status at age 14 through Zoo York, after finishing in 6th place at Zoo York's Am Getting Paid 2006 Street Finals. Since then, he has been regularly finishing in the top tier of many events and has been selected to compete in Street League Skateboarding with the best skaters around the world.

Ortiz is featured in the video game Tony Hawk: Shred. He is of mixed Mexican and Irish ancestry.

Sponsorship 
Chaz Ortiz turned pro at the age of 14 through Zoo York, and has since then accumulated sponsorships from Zoo York, DGK, Ricta Wheels, Krux Trucks, Mob Grip, Bronson Bearings, Shapes Wax, Uprise Skateshop, Ethika, and OC Ramps.

Contest history

References

American skateboarders
1994 births
Living people
American sportspeople of Mexican descent